Xu Guangping (1898 – 1968), her former name "Xu Chongqian", was a Chinese female writer, politician, and social activist. She was well known as the partner of Chinese writer Lu Xun.

Biography

Born in Guangzhou in a family of Great Qing official. In 1918 She entered Tianjin Zhili No.1 Normal School for Women. She was participated in the activities of the Tianjin Women's Patriotic Association and the Enlightenment Society during the May 4th Movement. After graduating in 1922, she was admitted to the Chinese Language Department of Peking Female High Normal College and became a student of Lu Xun, Xu Shoushang, and Yi Peiji. She was graduated in 1926.

Xu publicly expressed her feelings for her teacher, Lu Xun, in the newspaper one year before graduation, and the couple lived together in Guangzhou in 1927, and then moved to Shanghai. In 1929, Lu Xun only son  was born in Shanghai. Xu Guangping and Lu Xun lived together until his death in 1936.

After the establishment of the People's Republic of China in 1949, Xu Guangping successively served as the Deputy Secretary-General of the Central People's Government Administration, the vice-chairwoman of the All-China Women's Federation, and the vice-chairwoman of the China Federation of Literary and Art Circles.

She was the third secretary-general of the China Association for Promoting Democracy. She was a member of the first to third Standing Committee of the Chinese People's Political Consultative Conference and National People's Congress. She joined the Communist Party of China in 1960.

She donated all the works and cultural relics left by Lu Xun to the country.
She died in Beijing on March 3, 1968, due to illness.

Xu Guangping wrote under the pen names Jing Song and Xu Xia.

Works
 Letters from Two Places (兩地書, 1933)

See also
 Lu Xun
 Zhou An
 Zhou Haiying
 Xiao Hong
 Xiao Jun

References

External links
 Tragedy of Lu Xun
 Two women in the life of Lu Xun
 Why Lu Xun call Xu Guangping as "brother"
 Thâm nhập ngôi nhà thanh đạm của Lỗ Tấn

1898 births
1968 deaths
Republic of China writers
Chinese women writers
Chinese women in politics
Members of the China Association for Promoting Democracy
Members of the China Democratic League
Members of the Standing Committee of the 3rd National People's Congress
Members of the Standing Committee of the 2nd National People's Congress
Members of the Standing Committee of the 1st National People's Congress
Members of the Standing Committee of the 3rd Chinese People's Political Consultative Conference
Members of the Standing Committee of the 2nd Chinese People's Political Consultative Conference
Members of the Standing Committee of the 1st Chinese People's Political Consultative Conference
People's Republic of China politicians from Guangdong
Chinese Communist Party politicians from Guangdong
Politicians from Guangzhou
People from Panyu District
Writers from Guangzhou
Lu Xun
All-China Women's Federation people